The Tomb of Aegisthus is a Mycenaean tholos tomb located near the citadel of Mycenae, Greece. It was constructed in the Late Helladic IIA period, approximately 1510–1450 BCE, and rediscovered in the 19th century. It was first excavated by Winifred Lamb in 1922, as part of a project led by Alan Wace. 

The Tomb of Aegisthus is the third-largest tholos tomb at Mycenae and the fourth-largest in the Aegean. Its architecture shows various transitional features between the architectural style of the oldest and later tholoi at Mycenae, such as the incorporation of ashlar masonry into the dromos and the use of a relieving triangle, though this latter feature was not recognised until the 1990s. Scholars have debated whether the tomb was constructed in a single phase, or whether some of these features represent later modifications to the tomb.

The tomb's traditional name comes from Greek mythology, in which Aegisthus was a king of Mycenae and the murderer of both Atreus and Agamemnon. No burials were found inside the tomb and the identity of the person or people who may have constructed it remains a mystery: the name likely dates to the late 19th or early 20th centuries, by association with the nearby tholoi conventionally known as the Treasury of Atreus and the Tomb of Clytemnestra.

At the time of its construction, the tomb was the largest in the Aegean region. The dating of the tomb was important in the 1920s in settling the so-called 'Helladic Heresy', and clarifying the relationship between Mycenaean Greece and Minoan Crete.

The tomb

Description

The tomb is located to the west of the citadel of Mycenae, approximately 70m from the Lion Gate, in an area used for burial since the Middle Helladic period ( 2000–1600 BCE). Its structure follows the typical tripartite division of Mycenaean tholos tombs into a narrow rectangular passageway (dromos), joined by a deep doorway (stomion) to a burial chamber (thalamos) surmounted by a corbelled dome. The dromos is approximately 22.45m long by 4.65m wide, while the thalamos is 13.96m in diameter and would originally have stood around 13m tall. Like most tholoi at Mycenae, it is cut into the slope, facing downhill.

A 'relieving triangle' was built above the tomb's lintel, helping to direct the stress from the weight of the masonry towards the supported ends of the lintel-stone and therefore to reduce the torque applied to the stone. Such a feature would become universal in later tholos tombs at Mycenae, but the Tomb of Aegisthus is the earliest tholos to feature it. Other innovations include the lining of the dromos with rubble and the use of poros ashlar masonry for the façade, both of which foreshadow architectural conventions common in later tombs.

None of the tholoi at Mycenae were discovered intact, having been looted in antiquity, probably during the Iron Age. A likely burial pit was discovered in the floor of the thalamos, but no human remains were recovered to indicate who, if anyone, might have been buried in it.

Construction

James Wright has described the construction of tholos tombs, using the Tomb of Aegisthus as an example, as a 'monumental expression of power'. Digging out the thalamos alone required the excavation of 1,810m3 of earth, added to 585m3 for the dromos — a total project which Wright estimates would require a ten-person team to work for 240 days, on top of additional labour for the procurement, preparation and arrangement of the rubble and ashlar masonry used in the dromos and stomion. He considers that the total construction of the tomb would have taken over a year, and required a large workforce including skilled stoneworkers.

During the excavation, Wace incorrectly concluded that the Tomb of Aegisthus had no relieving triangle, a judgement which remained the scholarly consensus until 1997, when the area above the lintel was cleared during conservation work. The work revealed that the interior of the triangle, photographed by Wace in 1922, had been filled with a blocking wall some time after its initial construction, though the intrusion of much-later ceramic material into the space, partly as the result of an earthquake, made it impossible to ascertain the precise date.

The façade of the stomion is faced with large blocks of poros limestone ashlar, behind which the structure is built from rubble masonry like that which lines the dromos. Wace believed that the ashlar façade was a later addition to the tomb, and that the monument had been constructed in two phases — firstly, the tomb was built in its entirety using rubble masonry, and later, 'with the object of making its entrance more imposing', a new ashlar façade was added. In support of this conclusion, he noted that the rubble masonry is bonded by mortar to that of the stomion, but that the ashlar masonry of the stomion is not bonded to the rubble masonry behind it; in addition, the ashlar façade seems to play little role in supporting the structural weight of the thalamos'''s corbelled dome. However, Wace's two-phase model has been questioned since the late 20th century: Clare Loader argued in 1998 that the ashlar façade may have played a structural role in buttressing the rubble one behind it, and so been added either during or immediately after the initial construction of the tomb, while Yannis Galanakis has argued that the tomb's unusual features may represent a single coherent plan, the result of 'architectural experimentation', perhaps influenced by the contemporaneous building of the tholos tomb at Berbati, and that the evidence is insufficient to tell whether the tomb was built in a single phase or in two.

 Name 

The tomb is named for Aegisthus, the mythological lover of Clytemnestra, wife of king Agamemnon of Mycenae. In Greek mythology, Aegisthus first murdered Atreus, Agamemnon's father, in order to restore his own father Thyestes to the throne; then, after Agamemnon drove him from power and departed for the Trojan War, Aegisthus became the lover of Clytemnestra and, on Agamemnon's return from Troy, assisted her in murdering the king. He then ruled Mycenae for seven years until he was killed in turn by Orestes, Agamemnon's son, alongside Clytemnestra.

The nearby Treasury of Atreus or 'Tomb of Agamemnon' was traditionally known by that name long before the renewal of archaeological interest in it in the 19th century. The Tomb of Aegisthus is so named because it is positioned adjacent to another tholos, known as the 'Tomb of Clytemnestra'. The precise origin of its name is uncertain: Christos Tsountas, who first published the rediscovery of the tomb in 1892, did not name it, only referring to it as 'another [tomb] not far from the Lions' Gate', nor did he assign it a name in his 1897 publication of The Mycenaean Age. Alan Wace mentioned that the tomb is 'now christened the Tomb of Aegisthus' in his 1923 write-up of his excavations, and had previously referred to it by that name in the excavation daybook of 1922.

Post-Mycenaean history
The dome collapsed some time after the tomb's construction: from an original height of  13m, only about 8m of height remains.

Wace noted finds of Geometric, Classical and Hellenistic pottery, particularly in the dromos, which he interpreted as the remains of post-Mycenaean tomb-robbers. However, it has since been suggested that they may represent the use of the tomb for 'hero cult' from the Iron Age onward, a practice observed at many of the Mycenaean chamber tombs at Mycenae and other sites in the Argolid, such as Prosymna. The tomb may have played an ideological role for the short-lived Argive colony at Mycenae, established in the 3rd century BCE but abandoned within a century, which restored the so-called 'Agamemnonion' (shrine of Agamemnon) between Mycenae and Prosymna and may have used the Mycenaean tombs now known as 'Aegisthus', 'Epano Phournos' and 'Clytemnestra' as a focus for the commemoration of Mycenae's heroes, in doing so asserting its status and prestige vis-à-vis Argos.The 1922 excavations also found a layer of ash inside the thalamos, with the remains of several olive kernels, on top of the traces of the collapsed dome. Wace hypothesised that this reflected the use of the tomb, after the end of the Mycenaean period, as a shelter for 'shepherds, outlaws or others having work in the neighbourhood', and that the kernels represented the remains of food, particularly bread and olives, that they ate around campfires while sheltering from the wind.

Excavation

The tomb was first formally described by Christos Tsountas in 1892, though it may have been noticed by Friedrich Gottlieb Welcker during his travels through Greece in 1843. Tsountas' excavations of 1892 found the tomb in the course of clearing the adjacent Tomb of Clytemnestra, but did not excavate as the tomb was only discovered towards the end of the digging season, and Tsountas considered that he did not have sufficient time. He returned and partially explored the tomb in 1893. 

Wace's excavations (1922)

The British School at Athens began excavations at Mycenae in 1920, encouraged by Arthur Evans, whose excavations of Knossos on Crete between 1900 and 1905 had introduced the concept of 'Minoan Civilisation'. Evans' work on Crete raised questions as to the origins and development of the 'Mycenaean' civilisation, labelled as such after Heinrich Schliemann's 1876 excavations of the Shaft Graves at Mycenae. In Evans' mind, his discoveries at Knossos proved that Crete was the centre of the dominant power of the Bronze-Age Aegean, in line with the Classical myths of a Cretan 'thalassocracy' under King Minos. With some assistance from Evans, the British School at Athens persuaded both the Greek government and Christos Tsountas, who held the permit, to allow them to excavate with Alan Wace as field director.

Evans had been particularly keen for the excavation of the Tomb of Aegisthus, and donated  towards that project, believing that the exercise would provide confirmatory evidence that 'Minoans' had risen to dominance at Mycenae between the Shaft Grave period (c.1600–1450 BCE) and the construction of the tholoi. Wace, meanwhile, had previously co-authored a 1918 article with Carl Blegen, arguing instead for an essential continuity between 'Helladic' culture through the Shaft Graves until the end of the Bronze Age, and that the character of Middle Helladic and later mainland culture was 'Mycenaean as opposed to Cretan'. Where Evans believed that the Shaft Graves and tholoi were broadly contemporary, both representing the burials of Minoan rulers of Mycenae, Wace and Blegen correctly believed that the tholoi were considerably later. Excavations of the then-unexplored tholoi (all except the Treasury of Atreus and the Tomb of Clytemnestra) were intended to settle the question of their chronology, and so, in Wace's mind, to disprove the chronological assumptions on which Evans' argument rested. John Percival Droop later called Wace and Blegen's ideas the 'Helladic Heresy'.

The tomb was excavated between 15 June and 8 July 1922 by Winifred Lamb, who was serving as second-in-charge of the Mycenae excavations under Wace. While  the tomb was not intact, and appeared to have been largely emptied since the Mycenaean period, the excavation found the partial remains of a boar's tusk helmet at a level approximately 1m above the dromos floor, as well as gold, ivory, obsidian and carnelian objects on the original floor level of the dromos, which Wace took to belong to the original contents of the tomb. Among the finds were small fragments of an ivory carving, which Wace reconstructed as being similar in design to the relief of the Lion Gate, approximately 20cm wide. Several Palace-style piriform jars, made on Crete during the LM II period ( 1440–1400 BCE), were found in fragments trodden into the floor of both the dromos and the thalamos, providing strong evidence that they were part of the earliest burial assemblages in the tomb, and therefore helping both to date the monument and to provide evidence of connections between Mycenae and Minoan Crete in this period.

Wace and Lamb had planned to excavate the tomb in its entirety between 1922 and 1923, but were unable to return in 1923 due to safety concerns about the partially-collapsed dome roof. They therefore left the tomb with the dromos and stomion entirely excavated, but about a third of the thalamos uncleared. While the project had intended to fully excavate all seven of the thus-far unexcavated tholoi at Mycenae between 1920 and 1923, the Tomb of Aegisthus would be the only one excavated in this period: the others were, however, re-examined and their first architectural plans drawn up by Piet de Jong. Wace's team also undertook conservation work on the monument, including the digging of a drain around the tomb to prevent rain damage.

Importance to the 'Helladic Heresy'

By May 1923, Wace and Lamb had constructed the outline of a three-phase chronological model for the tholoi at Mycenae, in which they argued for a progressive increase in the scale and monumentality of the tombs. The features of the Tomb of Aegisthus (see table below), while mostly belonging to the 'first group' dated to early LH IIA ( 1510–1480 BCE), included attributes common to early tombs in the 'second group', dated later in LH IIA ( 1480–1450 BCE). The large quantity of diagnostic pottery found in the Aegisthus tomb, including broken LH II vessels found partly in the dromos and partly in the thalamos, allowed Wace to confidently date the tomb to early LH IIA, and so to argue that it represented the transition between the 'first group' and the 'second group' — in particular, that the supposed second phase of construction had been intended to bring the tomb into line with the innovations employed by the 'second group'.
The Tomb of Aegisthus' transitional status, between the 'first group' and 'second group' of tholoi, as well the fact that its date could be securely ascertained from ceramic remains, provided strong evidence for the validity of Wace's chronology. This was important to the 'Helladic Heresy' for two reasons. Firstly, it demonstrated that the grandest examples of tholoi at Mycenae, particularly the Treasury of Atreus ( 1350 BCE) and the Tomb of Clytemnestra ( 1300 BCE), were indeed considerably later in date than both the Shaft Graves ( 1600–1450 BCE) and the apogee of Neopalatial Minoan civilisation on Crete, which ended around 1500 BCE. Secondly, the apparent 'crescendo' of monumentality and elaboration in Mycenae's tholoi did not fit with Evans' view that Mycenae had become subjected and subordinated to Crete during the period of their construction, which Evans argued would have produced a 'diminuendo' in the site's wealth and ostentation.

 Later excavations 

As part of Wace's Mycenae excavations of 1939–1954, William Taylour excavated the area around the outside of the Tomb of Aegisthus, finding a thick layer of clay which had been used in the construction of the tholos to augment and waterproof the corbelled dome.

Further excavations were carried out by the Archaeological Society of Athens in 1955, under the direction of Ioannis Papadimitriou. These excavations cleared the part of the thalamos left unexcavated by the British excavations of 1922, revealing more pottery from the Neopalatial and Hellenistic periods and providing confirmatory evidence for Wace's dating of the tomb. 

Conservation

In 1915, the Greek Archaeological Service reinforced the lintel stone of the inner rubble façade, which had cracked, with concrete. 

In addition to the digging of a drain in 1923, conservation work was carried out by Alan Wace's team during the 1920–1923 seasons. This included the use of cement and fresh stone to reinforce the tomb's inner doorway, and the replacement of missing pieces of masonry around the tomb with new ones, which were sometimes cemented into place.

By the 1990s, the tholos had been severely damaged by erosion from the ingress of rain water, particularly in the stomion''. Further conservation work was carried out by the Greek Archaeological Service in 1997–1998 to reinforce the internal structure of the tomb, which also revealed the existence of the small relieving triangle above the lintel.

Footnotes

Explanatory Notes

References

Bibliography

 
 
 
 
 
 
 
 
 
 
 
 
 
 
 
 
 
 
 
 
 
 
 
 
 
 
 
 
 

Buildings and structures completed in the 15th century BC
1892 archaeological discoveries
Mycenaean Greece
Mycenae
Mycenaean tombs
Archaeological discoveries in Greece
Tombs in Greece
Mycenaean tholos tombs